The 2015–16 Weber State Wildcats women's basketball team represented Weber State University during the 2015–16 NCAA Division I women's basketball season. The Wildcats were led by fourth year head coach Bethann Ord and played their home games at the Dee Events Center as members of the Big Sky Conference. They finished the season 23–12, 11–7 in Big Sky play to finish sixth place. They advanced to the quarterfinals of the Big Sky women's tournament where they lost to Idaho. They were invited to the Women's Basketball Invitational where they defeated New Mexico in the first round, Weber State in the quarterfinals, USC Upstate before losing to Louisiana–Lafayette in the championship game.

Radio Broadcasts
All Wildcats games will be heard on KWCR with Nick Bailey calling the action. All home games and conference road games will also be streamed with video live online through Watch Big Sky.

Roster

Schedule

|-
!colspan=9 style="background:#4B2187; color:#FFFFFF;"| Exhibition

|-
!colspan=8 style="background:#4B2187; color:#FFFFFF;"| Non-conference regular season

|-
!colspan=8 style="background:#4B2187; color:#FFFFFF;"| Big Sky regular season

|-
!colspan=9 style="background:#4B2187;"| Big Sky Women's Tournament

|-
!colspan=9 style="background:#4B2187;"| WBI

See also
2015–16 Weber State Wildcats men's basketball team

References

Weber State Wildcats women's basketball seasons
Weber State
Weber State